The Boeing AT-15 was an American twin-engined bomber crew trainer designed and built by Boeing's Wichita Division. Only two prototypes, designated XAT-15, were built. Plans to build over 1,000 were cancelled on the United States' entry into the Second World War.

Development

One of the first projects for the former Stearman Aircraft Company which in 1939 had become the Wichita Division of Boeing was a twin-engined trainer for bomber crews. Designated X-120 by the company, two examples were ordered by the United States Army Air Corps as the XAT-15. The AT-15 was a high-wing cantilever monoplane with two wing-mounted Pratt & Whitney R-1340 Wasp radial engines. It had a retractable tailwheel landing gear and an extended glazed fuselage nose for the trainee bomb-aimer. Due to shortage of materials, the aircraft was built of welded steel tube covered with plywood, with wooden wings and tail unit. The two aircraft were delivered to the USAAC, but after the country's entry into the war a change in priorities resulted in the planned order for more than 1,000 aircraft not being placed.

Operator

 United States Army Air Corps

Specifications (XAT-15)

See also

References

Notes

Bibliography

External links

 Aerofiles

1940s United States military trainer aircraft
AT-15 (X)
AT-15
High-wing aircraft
Aircraft first flown in 1942
Twin piston-engined tractor aircraft